The Iraq Short Film Festival is an Iraqi film festival for short films established in 2005.

References

Film festivals in Iraq
2005 establishments in Iraq
Short film festivals